The Belgium national quidditch team, also known as the Belgian Gryffins, is the national team of Belgium in quidditch. The team was founded in 2014 upon the announcement of the 2014 IQA Global Games, the International Quidditch Association's second international tournament featuring national teams.

The team is overseen by the Belgian Quidditch Federation, the head organisation of all quidditch in Belgium. The name Gryffins and the logo come from the combination of Belgium's two community's symbols: the Walloon cock and the Flemish lion.

History
The Gryffins were founded in 2014 under the guiding of Canadian David Danos at the announcement of the 2014 Global Games in Burnaby, B.C., Canada. As Belgium's quidditch scene was young and developing, unlike other nations, there were no try-outs for the 2014 team. The decision for who went rested on the individual player's ability to fund themselves. The Gryffins held a crowd-funding campaign through Indiegogo where they raised nearly €1000 of the €8000 needed and were keeping a social media presence through their Facebook and Twitter pages.

After appearing at the European Games in Sarteano, Italy (July 2015), and ranking fourth in Europe, the Gryffins will once again compete in a worldwide event at World Cup 2016 in Frankfurt.

Colours

The colours of the team have always been that of the Belgium tricolore, red, gold and black. Since in quidditch it is illegal to sport a jersey primarily with yellow due to confusion with snitches, the primary colours are always red or black with yellow as a flair.

Jersey History
The design of the 2014 jerseys were put through a popular vote open to any interested Belgian quidditch player. The majority chose the option created by Julie-Anne Weber, who designed the paw, and Cory Faniel, who dealt with the colour layout. 

In November 2014, a popular vote ranked the Gryffins' jersey among the five best quidditch team uniforms in the world, according to the readers of The Quidditch Post. A jury of editors graded each submission and, after aggregating the score of popular and jury votes, Belgium was awarded the title of World's Best Quidditch Uniform for the jersey design displayed above.

In 2015, the decision was made to maintain a similar design for the European Games jersey, though a change in provider resulted in some necessary tweaking.

Players

The team is open to any player that is a Belgian citizen or permanent resident, a temporary resident of Belgium or has excessive contact with Belgian quidditch at the discretion of the head of Belgium Muggle Quidditch.

2014-2015 Vancouver

The first roster was established for the 2014 Global Games in Vancouver. No try-outs were held and players had to be chosen on the basis of whether or not they could afford the trip. The following players took part to this competition.

2015-2016 Sarteano

Following the announce of the European Games, it was decided that new players would be selected to compete in Sarteano, Italy, against other European national teams. This would reflect the growth of quidditch in Belgium and increase the depth of the team  The selection process involved scouting players who had applied to be part of the team, but no try-outs. The final roster was announced on May 22 and consisted of 20 players, with only four Gryffins from the previous selection returning to the team. Two players were kept as reserve: Rik De Boeck and Brian Verbeure, with Rik ending up joining the team. The Belgian Quidditch Federation nominated Louis Lermytte and Corentin (Cory) Faniel as coaches.

2015-2016 Frankfurt

After receiving more than 60 applications, the four members of the selection committee named 32 players to take part to the first 3 trainings. The Selection committee was appointed by the Belgian Quididtch Federation to include both coaches from the previous year (Louis Lermytte and Cory Faniel), the former captain (Tim van Huygevoort) and a former member of the selection committee (Soraya A.). They also decided to appoint Louis Lermytte as coach who took Laurens Grinwis Plaat Stultjes as his non-playing assistant.

Team

2016 - 2017 European Games - Oslo

Competitive Record

2014 Global Games

The Gryffins made their debut at the 2014 IQA Global Games where they placed last. Due to lack of selection process and the fact that the team had just eleven players, the Gryffins had difficulties keeping to pace with the competition. However, as the quaffle point differentials show, Team Belgium, while outmatched, did not experience all complete losses, most notably in the Belgium-Canada game where a strong defensive line held the score to just 70-30* Canada. What solidified Belgium's seventh place was the final forfeit to Team USA where it was decided by the team to no longer progress as much of the team had succumbed to treatable injury.

* Indicates that that was forfeited with a 150*-0 loss.

** Indicates unknown game time.

2015 European Games

At the 2015 European Games, the Belgian Gryffins came second of their group, with the highest QPD, behind France and ahead of Turkey, Catalonia, Spain and Poland. Facing the host, Italy, in the quarter of finals, Belgium conceded no goal and proceeded to face the UK in the semi-final. This was among the toughest games of the tournament for the UK, but the Gryffins lost on a snitch catch. As a result, Belgium entered the 3rd place play-off against Norway, that had lost facing France in the other semi-final. This game saw Norway pull ahead before Belgium scored a series of goals, but failing to come back within snitch range before Norway ended the game. The team ranked fourth overall and firmly established the country as one of the strongest in Europe.

2016 World Cup

2017 European Games

See also

 Muggle quidditch
 International Quidditch Association
 Sport in Belgium

References

Quidditch national teams
Quidditch
National sports teams established in 2014
2014 establishments in Belgium